Saw Mya Aye Kyi (1892 – 1962) was a Burmese musician who specialized in performing the collection of Burmese classical songs known as the Mahāgīta. She was a royal mistress of Sir Sao Chel, Saopha of Hsipaw State. She has been dubbed as the "mother of Mahāgīta". A bronze bust of Saw Mya Aye Kyi stands outside the National Theatre of Mandalay.

Early life
Saw Mya Aye Kyi was born in Mandalay to Maung Maung Tin, a royal privy council officer, and Khin Phwar, the property custodian of the Princess of Saw Hla. Her given name was Khin Sein Kyi. She was a descendant of the Prince of Swetawoak, a member of the Konbaung royal family.

Royal mistress 

At the age of 12, Saw Mya Aye Kyi started learning traditional singing and dancing at Manusadda Shwedaung Kyaw Thu U Lugyi. A year later she went to the royal palace of Hsipaw to continue studying the Mahāgīta. She married Sir Sao Chel, Saopha of Hsipaw, when she was 17.

Sir Sao Chel recognized her proficiency in various parts of the Mahāgīta by awarding her the title of Sao Oakka at the age of 20. She also composed the patpyoe "Lamin Thawda". These were the last two songs to be included in the Mahāgīta.

Saw Mya Aye Kyi left Hsipaw Palace in 1928 and accompanied Yagan U Tin to Yangon. There she learned more traditional songs, eventually becoming regarded as the mother of the Mahāgīta.

Later career

Saw Mya Aye Kyi worked as a music teacher (pantya) until World War II, and tutored at the Yangon Music and Art School from 1953 to 1958. She was awarded the title of Alinkar Kyawswa by the government of Myanmar in 1952, honoring her contributions to the field of music. In 1954 she became the only person in Myanmar to receive an honorary Bachelor of Arts in the field of fine arts from the University of Yangon.

She worked for the History Commission as a music research fellow in 1962, and as a member of the MRTV Mahāgīta music scrutiny board. She also served as chairwoman of the Myanmar Musical Instrument Federation. She continued to teach the Mahāgīta until her death. Tin Tin Mya was one of her students.

Death
Saw Mya Aye Kyi died on February 10, 1968, in Yangon. Her hands and lips were gilded in accordance with tradition.

Reference

Burmese royal consorts
20th-century Burmese women singers
1892 births
1968 deaths
People from Mandalay
Recipients of the Alinkar Kyawswar